The Last of the Mohicans is the feature-length second part of the 1920 German silent Western film Lederstrumpf (Leatherstocking) directed by Arthur Wellin and featuring Bela Lugosi and Emil Mamalock. It is based on James Fenimore Cooper's 1826 novel of the same name. The first part is The Deerslayer and Chingachgook (Der Wildtöter und Chingachgook). A print of Lederstrumpf, in its heavily edited shortened U.S. version titled The Deerslayer, was discovered in the 1990s, but the original full-length German film is lost. Bela Lugosi played the Indian Chingachgook, one of his most unusual roles, and Emil Mamalock played Hawkeye, the Deerslayer.

Cast
In alphabetical order
 Charles Barley as Harry
 Edward Eyseneck as Worley
 Herta Heden as Judith Hutter
 Gottfried Kraus as Tom Hutter
 Bela Lugosi as Chingachgook, an Indian brave
 Emil Mamelok as the Deerslayer (aka Hawkeye)
 Erna Rehberger as Heddy Hutter
 Kurt Rottenburg as Magua (villain)
 Egon Söhnlein as Col. Munro
 Margot Sokolowska as Wah-ta-Wah
 Heddy Sven as Cora Munro

See also
 Bela Lugosi filmography

References

External links
 

1920 films
1920 Western (genre) films
Films based on The Last of the Mohicans
Films of the Weimar Republic
German black-and-white films
German sequel films
Silent German Western (genre) films
Films directed by Arthur Wellin
1920s German films